Clube de Desportos do Maxaquene, or C.D. Maxaquene, is a professional basketball club that is based in Maputo, Mozambique. The club competes in the Mozambican League.

History
C.D. Maxaquene won the FIBA Africa Clubs Champions Cup in 1985 and the FIBA Africa Women's Clubs Champions Cup in 1991. They also competed at the 1985 edition of the Intercontinental Cup.

Honours
Mozambican League
Champions: 2008, 2009
FIBA Africa Clubs Champions Cup
Champions (1): 1985

References

External links
AfroBasket.com Team Page

Basketball teams in Mozambique
Sport in Maputo